Highway 114 (AR 114, Ark. 114, and Hwy. 114) is a state highway in the Lower Arkansas Delta. The route of  runs from Highway 35 to US Highway 65 (US 65) in Gould. The route is maintained by the Arkansas Department of Transportation (ArDOT).

Route description

The highway begins in Cleveland County south of Rison at Highway 35. The route runs east to Calmer, where it has a brief officially designated exception with US 63 before entering Lincoln County.

In Lincoln County, Highway 114 has a junction with Highway 54 and Highway 530 before entering Star City. Highway 530 is a two-lane expressway planned as a future extension of Interstate 530 (I-530) south to a future I-69. The route enters Star City, intersecting Highway 11 Business (AR 11B) and forming a concurrency through the city. Highway 11B terminates at Highway 11, and Highway 11/Highway 114 continue to concur heading east to intersect US 425. The pair of routes remain concurrent to the east until Fresno, when Highway 114 turns east toward Gould. In Gould, Highway 114 intersects US 65, where it terminates.

History
Highway 114 was created on April 1, 1926 as one of the original state highways. The route ran east from State Road 11 at Fresno through Gould to Douglas. A second route was created in Cleveland County between Highway 35 and Calmer in July 1957. The gap between Calmer and Star City was closed in March 1962. Within Star City, Highway 114 was rerouted from Bradley Street to Arkansas Avenue upon completion of a widening project in 1967. In 2015, the section between US 65 and Douglas was removed from the state highway system.

Major intersections

See also

References

External links

114
Transportation in Cleveland County, Arkansas
Transportation in Lincoln County, Arkansas